Teodelina is a place situated in the General López Department of the Santa Fe Province, Argentina. It is located 376 km from the Santa Fe city, and 205 km from Rosario. It was established on December 19, 1894.

Populated places in Santa Fe Province